John Jarlath Dooley (6 July 1906 – 18 September 1997) was an Irish prelate of the Catholic Church who worked in the diplomatic service of the Holy See and in the Roman Curia.

Biography
John Jarlath Dooley was born in Kilmaine, Ireland, on 6 July 1906. He was ordained a priest of the Missionary Society of St. Columban on 20 December 1931.

On 18 October 1951, Pope Pius XII named him a titular archbishop and Apostolic Delegate to Indochina. He received his episcopal consecration from Archbishop Egidio Vagnozzi on 21 December 1951.

On 15 September 1959, Pope John XXIII appointed him to a position at the Secretariat of State.

He retired in 1966 at the age of 59.

Dooley died on 18 September 1997.

References

External links
Catholic Hierarchy: Archbishop John Jarlath Dooley, S.S.C.M.E. 

1906 births
1997 deaths
Officials of the Roman Curia
Diplomats of the Holy See
People from County Mayo
Missionary Society of St. Columban